Caleb Joshua Shomo (born December 1, 1992) is an American singer, musician, multi-instrumentalist, and songwriter. He is most well known as the lead-vocalist of hardcore punk band Beartooth, though he records all studio instrumentals for the band. He is also the former lead vocalist, keyboardist, and early backing vocalist of electronicore band Attack Attack!, and the owner of Studio Records in Columbus, Ohio. Shomo joined Attack Attack! as keyboardist at 15 years old while maintaining a passion for electronic music and eventually grew into record production by 18.

Music career

Attack Attack! (2008–2012)

In 2008, Shomo became keyboardist for Attack Attack!, an American metalcore band from Columbus, Ohio, formed in 2007. He had begun as a synth player and programmer when he was 15 as a freshman in high school, of which his influences contributed to the band's electronic sounds, and started doing lead clean and unclean vocals on October 19, 2009 when former vocalist Nick Barham left the group. 
In 2008 they signed to Rise Records and released their debut album Someday Came Suddenly on November 11. It peaked on the Billboard 200 at number 193.

In late 2009, they announced their self-titled album and released it on June 8, 2010. It peaked at number 26 on the Billboard 200, selling more than 15,000 copies in its first week. Shomo features clean vocals on tracks 1 to 5 and 17 and 18 of their deluxe release of self titled Attack Attack!. 
In November the next year, the band announced their third album titled This Means War. It was released on January 17, 2012. It has since become the band's best charting Billboard topping album, debuting and peaking at number 9 on the Billboard 200, selling more than 17,000 copies in its first week (although the self-titled album sold more records overall). Drummer Andrew Wetzel remarked it "fell off harder than the self-titled" on Formspring

Despite the band's growing success, Caleb Shomo left the band later that year due to clinical depression he had been dealing with since middle school. This had been causing him to have suicidal tendencies, and struggle with eating disorders, self-image problems and various substance abuse and addictions for the past year. Despite this, he left the band on good terms with the rest of the band supporting his decision. The band itself officially disbanded in May the same year.

Beartooth (2012–present)

Caleb Shomo began writing Beartooth songs while he was still in Attack Attack! as "a different musical outlet". Shomo has said the band originally "started as a joke band" with members of My Ticket Home, as a way to make fun, punk-rock, hardcore, wild music, play crazy shows and have a good time without pressure from anything. He wrote and recorded everything with all the instruments and did all of the production for their music. The band was originally called Noise, but was switched to Beartooth upon realization the name was already taken.

On June 7, 2013, Shomo announced that Beartooth was now signed to Red Bull Records. Beartooth released their debut EP Sick for free on their website on July 26, 2013. On May 13, 2014 the band's Facebook page announced the release date for their debut album, Disgusting, as June 10, 2014, along with its track listing. The band released their first single of the album the same day, titled 'Beaten in Lips', along with its music video. The album was available to stream online a day before its release.

On June 3, 2016, Beartooth released another album titled Aggressive, with the headlining track of the album posing the same name. In an interview with Kerrang! Magazine, Shomo stated that he felt that the album had a much happier outlook than the previous album, Disgusting. That being said, he still cites that there are parts of the album that refer to the constant battle that he faces with clinical depression, and mentions that is shown in the song "Find a Way". The songs "Aggressive", "Always Dead", "Loser", and "Hated", were all released prior to the album being released.

On July 18, 2018, the songs "Infection", "Disease", and "Believe" leaked online forcing the band to reveal the name of their new album, Disease, the tracklisting and its artwork. On September 28, Beartooth released their third studio album "Disease". During writing and recording the "Disease" album, a mini-series of videos about 'making of' of the album were posted on YouTube, named after one of the songs "Greatness or Death" from the third album.

CLASS (2012–present)
Along with the announcement of Beartooth after departing from Attack Attack!, he also announced in 2012 that he started making electronic music under the name CLASS. In an interview with Altpress he expressed that he had always loved electronic music and had been creating such music since before he joined Attack Attack!. He self-released an EP consisting of 4 tracks on January 2, 2013. Since the release the project has remained inactive, but when asked about it he responded with "...I'm ready to go full-force with that. A few of the deals we're working on are addressing the whole thing."

Personal life
In 2012, he left Attack Attack! citing "horrible clinical depression" and revealed that he had been suicidal since middle school. Sometime that year (around April 1 according to Fleur's Instagram account), he married Fleur Shomo. In 2014 when interviewed by Kerrang! he stated that thanks to the success of his musical career he is moving into a new home where he will build a new sunlit studio to record his own music and produce others.

On December 10, 2020, Austrian duo CueStack released their Through the Night EP featuring David Hasselhoff's first heavy metal performance. A remix of the song, produced by Shomo was also released.

Discography

Attack Attack!

Someday Came Suddenly (2008)
Attack Attack! (2010)
This Means War (2012)

Beartooth

Disgusting (2014)
Aggressive (2016)
Disease (2018)
Below (2021)

Class
Stereo Typical EP (2012)

Guest appearances

Production credits

References

Living people
American rock guitarists
American male guitarists
American heavy metal singers
Singers from Ohio
American electronic musicians
Guitarists from Ohio
Record producers from Ohio
Songwriters from Ohio
21st-century American male singers
21st-century American singers
21st-century American guitarists
21st-century American keyboardists
American male songwriters
1992 births